Laurent Brissaud (born 10 December 1965 in Valence, Drôme) is a French slalom canoeist.

Career
Brissaud competed from the mid-1980s to the early 1990s. He won a bronze medal in the K1 team event at the 1987 ICF Canoe Slalom World Championships in Bourg-Saint-Maurice.

He also finished fifth in the K1 event at the 1992 Summer Olympics in Barcelona.

World Cup individual podiums

References
Sports-Reference.com profile

1965 births
Canoeists at the 1992 Summer Olympics
French male canoeists
Living people
Olympic canoeists of France
Medalists at the ICF Canoe Slalom World Championships
Sportspeople from Valence, Drôme